Curio is a genus of flowering plant in the family Asteraceae. Plants in the genus are evergreen succulents with long, striated leaves and discoid flower heads lacking ray florets.

Taxonomy
The genus was described by English botanist Paul V. Heath and published in Calyx 5(4): 136, 1997. It contains over 20 species, all of them formerly belonging to the genus Senecio.

Species
 Curio acaulis 
 Curio archeri 
 Curio articulatus  (Kleinia articulata)
 Curio avasimontanus 
 Curio citriformis 
 Curio crassulifolius 
 Curio cuneifolius 
 Curio ficoides 
 Curio hallianus 
 Curio herreanus 
 Curio humbertii 
 Curio muirii 
 Curio ovoideus 
 Curio × peregrinus 
 Curio pondoensis  
 Curio radicans 
 Curio repens 
 Curio rowleyanus 
 Curio sulcicalyx 
 Curio talinoides

References

 
Asteraceae genera